Marianela may refer to:

People
 Carmen Barros (born 1925), Chilean actress and singer nicknamed Marianela
Marianela De La Hoz (born 1956), Mexican painter
 Marianela González (born 1978), Venezuelan actress
 Marianela Huen (born 1960), Venezuelan swimmer
 Marianela Lacayo (born 1981), Nicaraguan model and entrepreneur
 Marianela Mirra (born 1988), Argentine television personality
 Marianela Núñez (born 1982), Argentine dancer
 Marianela Pereyra (born 1979), American television personality
 Marianela Pinales (born 1972), Dominican lawyer
 Marianela Quesada (born 1988), Costa Rican swimmer
 Marianela Rodriguez (born 1991), Cuban model and actress
 Marianela Salazar (born c. 1978), Panamanian model
 Marianela Szymanowski (born 1990), Argentine footballer

Media
 Marianela (1940 film), a 1940 Spanish film
 Marianela (1955 film), a 1955 Argentine film
 Marianela (novel), an 1878 novel by Benito Pérez Galdós
 Marianela (TV series), a 1961 Mexican telenovela